This is a list of puzzle games within the Mario franchise.

Dr. Mario series

Mario's Picross series

Mario vs. Donkey Kong series

Others

References